Gamba Osaka Under−23 was a Japanese football team based in Suita, Osaka.   It was the reserve team of Gamba Osaka and played in J3 League which they have done since their entry to the league at the beginning of the 2016 season.   They played the majority of their home games at Panasonic Stadium Suita with some played at Expo '70 Commemorative Stadium.

History

Gamba joined J3 League in 2016 along with the reserve teams of neighbours Cerezo Osaka and also FC Tokyo.   None of these clubs are eligible for promotion to J2 League additionally they can only name 3 outfield players over the age of 23 in any one match.   Gamba played their first J3 game on 13 March 2016, a 0-0 draw at home to YSCC Yokohama in front of 3,359 spectators.

League record
{|class="wikitable" style="text-align:center"
|-bgcolor="#efefef"
! Season !! Division !!Tier !! Teams !! Pos. !!GP !!W !!D !!L !!F !!A !!GD !!Pts !!Attendance/G !!Top scorer 
|-
|2016
|bgcolor=#FFC655 rowspan="5"|J3 ||rowspan="5"|3
|16 ||9th ||30 ||10 ||8 ||12 ||42 ||41 ||1 ||38 ||2,401 ||Ritsu Doan 10
|-
|2017
|17 ||16th ||32 ||7 ||5 ||20 ||31 ||65 ||-34 ||26 ||1,226 ||Kazunari Ichimi 8
|-
|2018
|17 ||6th ||32 ||13 ||8 ||11 ||53 ||43 ||10 ||47 ||1,382 ||Kazunari Ichimi 8
|-
|2019
|18 ||17th ||34 ||9 ||8 ||17 ||54 ||55 ||-1 ||35 ||1,263 ||Shoji Toyama 10
|-
|2020 †
|18 ||14th ||34 ||9 ||8 ||17 ||43 ||55 ||-12 ||35 ||595 ||Shoji Toyama 10
|}
Key

Coaching staff

The Coaching Staff for the 2020 J3 League season;

Current squad

*

 * = Overage player

References

External links
 Official website 

Gamba Osaka U-23
Football clubs in Osaka
J.League clubs
Association football clubs established in 2016
Panasonic
2016 establishments in Japan
Defunct football clubs in Japan
Association football clubs disestablished in 2020
2020 disestablishments in Japan